"New Sensation" is a song by Australian rock group INXS. It was the third single (second in the UK) released from their sixth studio album, Kick (1987). The music was composed by Andrew Farriss and the lyrics were written by Michael Hutchence. The song features a signature Kirk Pengilly sax solo and lyrics about a partying lifestyle.

"New Sensation" was released in the United Kingdom on 29 December 1987 and was issued worldwide the following year. It reached  3 on the US Billboard Hot 100, No. 9 in Australia, No. 25 in the United Kingdom, and No. 1 in Canada. The first line on the track, "Live, baby, live", was later referenced in the title of the band's 1991 release Live Baby Live. The video for the song was filmed on the roof of Municipal House in Prague and directed by Richard Lowenstein.

Critical reception
Cash Box called "New Sensation" "the popiest, hookiest song on the album, perhaps the most radio ready." In January 2018, as part of Triple M's "Ozzest 100", the 'most Australian' songs of all time, "New Sensation" was ranked number 44.

Live performances
INXS and J.D. Fortune performed the song at the 2010 AFL Grand Final along with "Suicide Blonde". The song was also the first track to be performed at the London Astoria.

Track listings
7-inch: Atlantic / 7-89080 (US)
 "New Sensation" – 3:38
 "Guns in the Sky" (Kookaburra mix) – 2:20

 also available on MC (7 89080-4)

7-inch: Mercury / INXS 9 (UK)
 "New Sensation" – 3:40
 "Do Wot You Do" – 3:16

12-inch: Atlantic / 0-86572 (U.S.)
 "New Sensation" (Nick's 12-inch mix) – 6:28
 "Guns in the Sky" (Kick Ass mix) – 6:00

12-inch: Mercury / INXS 912 (UK)
 "New Sensation" – 3:40
 "Do Wot You Do" – 3:16
 "Love Is (What I Say)"
 "Same Direction"

12-inch: WEA Records / 0-258016 (Australia)
 "New Sensation" (Nick's 12-inch mix) – 6:28
 "Guns in the Sky" (Kick Ass mix) – 6:00
 "New Sensation" (Nick's 7-inch mix) – 3:40

Charts

Weekly charts

Year-end charts

Certifications

Covers
Alternative rock band Snow Patrol covered the song for their Late Night Tales compilation. Their rendition was received positively by Hot Press magazine, which wrote that the song had been "well and truly patroled".

References

1987 singles
1987 songs
APRA Award winners
Atlantic Records singles
INXS songs
RPM Top Singles number-one singles
Song recordings produced by Chris Thomas (record producer)
Songs written by Andrew Farriss
Songs written by Michael Hutchence